Osabuohien Osaretin (born 17 March 1989), better known by his stage name Sarz, is a Nigerian record producer and musician. Born in Benin City, Edo State, he is popularly known for the tag Sarz On The Beat/"Really", at the beginning or end of all his music productions.

His first full credit production work was for Lord of Ajasa's "See Drama" in 2007. He has produced tracks for Wizkid, Naeto C, Banky W, Skales, Shank, Reminisce, Goldie Harvey, eLDee, Wande Coal, YQ, Lojay and Niniola. He was formerly signed to Trybe Records, but left the outfit after his contract expired in November 2013.

Musical career
In 2010, Sarz produced the hit single "Jor Oh" and the remix for Jahbless which featured Durella, RuggedMan, Reminisce, Ice Prince and eLDee. The song won "Best Street Hop" and was nominated for "Best Collaboration" at The Headies. In 2011, he produced Shank's "Salute", eLDee's "Today Today" & "Wash Wash", Skales "Mukulu", Goldie Harvey's "Don't Touch my Body" and Reminisce's "Kako Bi Chicken". "Kako Bi Chicken" was nominated for "Best Street Hop" at The Headies, 2012. Later that year, he solely produced eLDee's Undeniable album (except "We Made It").

Sarz was nominated for the Nigeria Entertainment Awards 2012 "Producer of the Year" award alongside Don Jazzy. Although Don Jazzy won the award, he ended up giving the award to Sarz. Sarz won "Best New Producer" at the 2012 Dynamix Awards. He went on to release his first single “Beat Of Life (Samba)” featuring Nigerian Artiste, Wizkid from his upcoming album.

In 2013, he produced two songs on Wizkid's Ayo album, "Jaiye Jaiye" featuring Femi Kuti and "Kilofe". He was mentioned as one of the five new music producers giving Don Jazzy a run for his money by the Premium Times Nigeria. Sarz was reported to have signed an endorsement deal with Nike later that Year. Sarz was the executive producer for the official Hennessy Artistry 2014 theme song "Dance Go (Eau de Vie)", which featured Wizkid and 2Face Idibia.

In April 2020, Sarz and Shizzi decided to go live on Instagram for a face off titled "The Battle of Hits" on 30 March 2020, which attracted a peak of 19.2k live viewers across the world.

Awards and nominations

Discography

References

External links 
 Twitter
 

Living people
Nigerian hip hop record producers
21st-century Nigerian musicians
1989 births
Afrobeat musicians
Musicians from Benin City